Lychnis Mountain is a  mountain summit located in Banff National Park, in the Canadian Rockies of Alberta, Canada. It is part of the Sawback Range. Its nearest higher peak is Mount St. Bride,  to the north.

History

Lychnis Mountain was named in 1911 by James F. Porter for the alpine flower Lychnis. 

The mountain's name was officially adopted in 1956 when approved by the Geographical Names Board of Canada.

The first ascent of the mountain was made in 1969 by A.J. Kauffmann, W.L. Putnam, L. Putnam, and L.R. Wallace.

Geology

Like other mountains in Banff Park, Lychnis Mountain is composed of sedimentary rock laid down during the Precambrian to Jurassic periods. Formed in shallow seas, this sedimentary rock was pushed east and over the top of younger rock during the Laramide orogeny.

Climate

Based on the Köppen climate classification, Lychnis Mountain is located in a subarctic climate with cold, snowy winters, and mild summers. Temperatures can drop below −20 °C with wind chill factors below −30 °C.

References

See also
Geography of Alberta
Geology of Alberta

Gallery

External links
 Lychnis Mountain weather forecast
 Parks Canada web site: Banff National Park

Three-thousanders of Alberta
Mountains of Banff National Park
Alberta's Rockies